The German Commission for Electrotechnical, Electronic & Information Technologies of DIN and VDE, abbreviated DKE, is the German organisation responsible for the development and adoption of standards and safety specifications in the areas of electrical engineering, electronics and information technologies.

DKE constitutes a joint organisation of DIN (the organisation for general standards in Germany) and VDE (a technical-scientific association), the juridical responsibility for running the DKE being in the hands of the VDE.

The DKE is the German member within European standardisation organisations such as CENELEC and ETSI, and international organisations such as IEC.

A standard may be first proposed by individual members of the VDE. Then when it has achieved national status the standard then becomes sanctioned by DKE. If further the standard is adopted at an international level, it can become an IEC standard.

References

External links
DKE website
VDE website

Electrical safety standards organizations
Standards organisations in Germany